WFSC (1050 AM) is a radio station broadcasting a classic hits format. Licensed to Franklin, North Carolina, United States, it serves the Franklin area.  The station is currently owned by Sutton Radiocasting Corporation.

The station is an affiliate of the Atlanta Braves radio network, the largest radio affiliate network in Major League Baseball.

In early 2016, the station began simulcasting their content on the FM frequency of 104.9.

References

External links

FSC
1957 establishments in North Carolina
Radio stations established in 1957